Sister San Sulpicio (Spanish:La hermana San Sulpicio) is a 1927 Spanish silent comedy film directed by Florián Rey and starring Imperio Argentina. It was based on Armando Palacio Valdés's 1889 novel Sister San Sulpicio. In 1934 Rey remade it as a sound film again starring Argentina.

Cast
 María Anaya
 Imperio Argentina as Gloria / Hermana San Sulpicio  
 Florencia Bécquer 
 Carmen Fernández Mateu 
 Guillermo Figueras 
 Ramón Meca
 Ricardo Núñez 
 Modesto Rivas 
 Pilar Torres
 Evaristo Vedia

References

Bibliography
 Goble, Alan. The Complete Index to Literary Sources in Film. Walter de Gruyter, 1 January 1999.

External links 

1927 films
Spanish comedy films
Spanish silent films
1927 comedy films
1920s Spanish-language films
Films directed by Florián Rey
Films based on Spanish novels
Spanish black-and-white films
Silent comedy films